Poplar Gap Park is a county maintained park in Buchanan County, Virginia. The park is located equidistant from Grundy, Virginia and Prater, Virginia. The park sits at the top of a former strip mining site and was opened in 2001.  The park contains a football field, two baseball/softball fields, picnic shelters, and a playground.  The park is the site of Buchanan County Festival, held every July.

The park's elevation is 2061 feet above sea level.

Gallery

References

External links
County Website
Virginia Birding and Wildlife Trail at Poplar Gap Park/Sunset Hollow

Parks in Buchanan County, Virginia